Robert Alan Morse (May 18, 1931 – April 20, 2022) was an American actor, who starred in How to Succeed in Business Without Really Trying, both the 1961 original Broadway production, for which he won a Tony Award, and its 1967 film adaptation; and as Bertram Cooper in the critically acclaimed AMC dramatic series Mad Men (2007–2015). He won his second Tony Award for playing Truman Capote in the 1989 production of the one-man play Tru. He reprised his role of Capote in an airing of the play for American Playhouse in 1992, winning him a Primetime Emmy Award.

Early life
Morse was born on May 18, 1931, in Newton, Massachusetts, the second child of May (Silver), a pianist, and Charles Morse, who worked at a record store and managed a chain of movie theaters. He was Jewish. He attended a number of different schools until finding his inspiration in Henry Lasker, a music teacher at Newton High School who, according to Morse, "knew what I had burning in me and wanted to express". Upon graduation, he left home for New York City to fulfill his ambition of becoming an actor, joining his elder brother Richard who was already studying acting at the Neighborhood Playhouse. He received an uncredited role in The Proud and Profane (1956), a film starring William Holden and Deborah Kerr. Soon thereafter, he was cast as Barnaby Tucker in the original Broadway production of Thornton Wilder's The Matchmaker, launching his career.

Career
Morse earned multiple nominations and wins for Tony, Drama Desk, and Emmy awards over a period of five decades. He is well known for his appearances in musicals and plays on Broadway, as well as roles in movies and television shows. Perhaps best known for his role as young 1960s New York City businessman J. Pierrepont Finch in the 1961 Broadway production and 1967 film version of the Frank Loesser and Abe Burrows musical, How to Succeed in Business Without Really Trying, Morse gained new prominence in the late 2000s for his recurring role of elder 1960s New York City businessman Bertram Cooper on the AMC television show Mad Men.

Having already played Barnaby on Broadway, Morse reprised the role in the 1958 film adaptation of The Matchmaker, this time opposite Shirley Booth. That same year, he won the Theatre World Award and was nominated for the Tony Award for Best Performance by a Featured Actor in a Play for Say, Darling. In 1959 he received his second Tony nomination, for Best Performance by a Leading Actor in a Musical for his performance in Take Me Along. What was considered the final step toward full stardom was his performance as J. Pierrepont Finch in the Pulitzer Prize-winning How to Succeed in Business Without Really Trying. It won him the Tony Award for Best Performance by a Leading Actor in a Musical in 1962, and although he was not named on the award, he contributed to the Grammy Award-winning cast album. He also starred in the 1967 movie version.

In 1964, Morse co-starred in the comedy film Quick, Before It Melts. In 1965, Morse appeared in the black comedy film The Loved One, a movie based on the Evelyn Waugh novel of the same name which satirized the funeral business in Los Angeles, in particular Forest Lawn Cemetery. In 1967, he co-starred in Gene Kelly's A Guide for the Married Man, opposite Walter Matthau. In 1968, he appeared in the comedy Where Were You When the Lights Went Out? opposite Doris Day. In the same year, he appeared in the 1968 television series That's Life, which attempted to blend the musical genre with a situation comedy centered on newlyweds "Robert" and "Gloria" (played by E. J. Peaker). In 1968, he guest-starred on The Smothers Brothers Comedy Hour. In 1987, Morse also appeared in the movie The Emperor's New Clothes, which starred Sid Caesar and was part of the Cannon Movie Tales series.

Morse was in the original Broadway cast of Sugar, a 1972 musical stage adaptation of Some Like It Hot, for which he was nominated for another Tony. He won a Tony for Best Performance by a Leading Actor in a Play and the Drama Desk Award for Outstanding One-Person Show for his portrayal of Truman Capote in Tru (1989).  He starred in the 1976 musical So Long, 174th Street, which was based on the play Enter Laughing. The play received poor reviews and closed quickly. It was his last Broadway role for more than a decade.

In 1992, he recreated his Tru performance for the PBS series American Playhouse and won the Emmy Award as Best Actor in a Miniseries or Special. In 1999, Morse was inducted into the American Theater Hall of Fame for his long career as a stage actor. In 2002, Morse was cast in the role of the Wizard of Oz in the San Francisco run of the musical Wicked, but quit the show before it opened on Broadway. He was replaced by Joel Grey.

Morse joined other performers, including Marlo Thomas, in creating the 1972 Free to Be... You and Me children's album. He also provided the voice for the cartoon character Howler in Hanna-Barbera's Pound Puppies. He was the voice of Jack in the 1979 animated Rankin/Bass special Jack Frost. In The First Easter Rabbit, also by Rankin/Bass, he was the voice of the main character, Stuffy.

Morse appeared in dozens of TV shows, including Alfred Hitchcock Presents and The Twilight Zone. He also appeared on CBS Radio Mystery Theater.

Beginning in 2007, Morse took on a recurring role in the critically acclaimed AMC dramatic series Mad Men as Bertram Cooper, a founding partner in the advertising agency Sterling Cooper, for which role he was nominated for a Primetime Emmy Award for Outstanding Guest Actor in a Drama Series in 2008, 2010, 2011, 2013, and 2014.

Morse was cast as journalist Dominick Dunne in the critically acclaimed limited series The People v. O.J. Simpson on FX.

At the age of 85, Morse returned to Broadway in the 2016 revival of The Front Page with Nathan Lane, John Slattery, John Goodman, and Holland Taylor at the Broadhurst Theatre.

Personal life and death
Morse was married twice and had five children. He died at his home in Los Angeles, California, on April 20, 2022, at the age of 90.

Theatre

Filmography

Film

Television

Video games
Prototype 2 (2012) – Doctor Anton Koening (voice)

Awards and nominations 
Tony Awards 

Primetime Emmy Awards

Screen Actors Guild Awards

References

External links

 
 
 
 

1931 births
2022 deaths
American male film actors
American male musical theatre actors
American male stage actors
American male television actors
American male voice actors
Actors from Newton, Massachusetts
Audiobook narrators
Drama Desk Award winners
Male actors from Boston
Outstanding Performance by a Lead Actor in a Miniseries or Movie Primetime Emmy Award winners
Tony Award winners
United States Navy personnel of the Korean War
20th-century American male actors
21st-century American male actors